House of Bamboo is a 1955 American film noir shot in CinemaScope and DeLuxe Color, directed and co-written by Samuel Fuller, and starring Robert Ryan. The other co-screenwriter was Harry Kleiner. The cinematographer was Joseph MacDonald.

Plot
In 1954, a military train guarded by American soldiers and Japanese police is robbed of its cargo of guns, ammunition, and smoke bombs. During the robbery, a U.S. Army sergeant guarding the train is shot and killed. Five weeks later, a thief named Webber lies dying in a Tokyo hospital, shot by one of his own cohorts during a holdup in which smoke bombs were used. U.S. Army investigators discover Webber was shot by the same P38 pistol that killed the sergeant during the train robbery. Webber is questioned by military and police investigators, who discover among his possessions a letter from an American named Eddie Spanier, who wants to join Webber in Japan after his release from a U.S. prison. Though Webber refuses to implicate his fellow gang members, he does reveal that he is secretly married to a Japanese woman named Mariko Nagoya.

Three weeks later, Eddie arrives in Tokyo and makes contact with Mariko, gaining her trust with a photograph of himself taken with Webber, and learns about Webber's death. Mariko admits that Webber made her swear to keep their marriage a secret; she did not know about his criminal life and never sought help from the police out of fear that she could be targeted by his killers. Later, Eddie goes to a pachinko parlour, attempting to sell "protection" to the manager. But when he tries to shake down another parlour, he is beaten by a group of Americans led by racketeer Sandy Dawson, who is so intrigued with Eddie's audacity that he later arranges for him to join his gang, a group of disgruntled former American servicemen who have been dishonourably discharged. After being accepted into the gang, Eddie secretly meets with U.S. and Japanese investigators, for whom he is actually working undercover. To solidify his cover, Eddie asks Mariko to live with him as his "kimono girl." Hoping to discover who killed Webber, Mariko consents to Eddie's offer. In the meantime, Sandy grows to trust Eddie and even saves his life when Eddie is wounded during a robbery, surprisingly disregarding his own rule to leave wounded gang members for dead.

Eddie finally informs Mariko of his real identity – he is actually U.S. Army Sergeant Edward Kenner and is working as an undercover infiltrator into the Dawson gang. Mariko pledges to continue to assist Eddie in his investigation. When Charlie, one of Sandy's men, spies Mariko meeting with an American army officer to fill him in on the details of the Dawson gang's next heist, he notifies Sandy, and the job is thus aborted. However, an outside informant reveals to Sandy that (a) the police are poised to capture him and that (b) Eddie is a military plant. Sandy thus sets up Eddie's death with a fake robbery; he has Charlie knock Eddie unconscious and props him as the shop owner so that he will be shot by the police; but that plan backfires when Charlie is shot while trying to keep Eddie upright. Sandy is chased by the police and a recovered Eddie to a rooftop amusement park. After an intense gunfight, Eddie shoots and kills Sandy. The film ends with Eddie and Mariko being reunited.

Cast
 Robert Ryan as Sandy Dawson
 Robert Stack as Sgt. Edward Kenner (posing as Eddie Spanier)
 Shirley Yamaguchi as Mariko Nagoya-Webber
 Cameron Mitchell as Griff
 Brad Dexter as Capt. Hanson
 Sessue Hayakawa as Insp. Kita (dubbed by Richard Loo)
 DeForest Kelley as Charlie
 Biff Elliot as Webber
 Sandro Giglio as Ceram
 Elko Hanabusa as the screaming Japanese woman
 Harry Carey Jr as John (Arms Supplier)

Background
The narration at the film's beginning tells the viewer that the film was photographed entirely on location in Tokyo, Yokohama, and the Japanese countryside. At the movie's end, an acknowledgments credit thanks "the Military Police of the U.S. Army Forces Far East and the Eighth Army, as well as the Government of Japan and the Tokyo Metropolitan Police Department" for their cooperation with the film's production.

The film was one of a number of 20th Century Fox movies produced by Buddy Adler being shot on location in Asia around this time. Others included Soldier of Fortune, The Left Hand of God, and Love is a Many Splendored Thing. It was the second CinemaScope Fox film that Samuel Fuller made for the studio. Fuller, Stack, and Yamaguchi arrived in Japan on 26 January 1955.

Reception

Critical response
The staff of Variety magazine wrote of the film, "Novelty of scene and a warm, believable performance by Japanese star Shirley Yamaguchi are two of the better values in the production. Had story treatment and direction been on the same level of excellence, House would have been an all round good show. Pictorially, the film is beautiful to see; the talk's mostly in the terse, tough idiom of yesteryear mob pix."

Film critic Keith Uhlich believes the film is an excellent example of wide-screen photography.  He wrote in a review, "Quite simply, House of Bamboo has some of the most stunning examples of widescreen photography in the history of cinema. Traveling to Japan on 20th Century Fox's dime, Fuller captured a country divided, trapped between past traditions and progressive attitudes while lingering in the devastating aftereffects of an all-too-recent World War. His visual schema represents the societal fractures through a series of deep-focus, Non-theatrical tableaus, a succession of silhouettes, screens, and stylized color photography that melds the heady insanity of a Douglas Sirk melodrama (see, as an especial point of comparison, Sirk's 1956 Korea-set war film Battle Hymn) with the philosophical inquiry of the best noirs."

For many years after its initial release, the film was seen only on television in pan-and-scan prints, leading people to believe that DeForest Kelley has a small role near the end of the film. When Fox finally struck a new 35mm CinemaScope print for a film festival in the 1990s, viewers were surprised to see that Kelley is in the film all the way through; he was just always off to one side and thus had been panned out of the frame.

References in other films
A scene from House of Bamboo (in which Robert Ryan kills Cameron Mitchell while Mitchell is in a Japanese bathtub) is briefly shown prominently in the 2002 film Minority Report, when Tom Cruise (as Anderton) visits the squalid eye clinic. The scene actually echoes the plot of Minority Report and anticipates what happens next (or what is supposed to happen next): Mitchell is killed while not being responsible of what Ryan accuses him of; symmetrically, Mike Binder (as Leo Crow) is supposed to be killed by Anderton/Cruise, when Binder/Crow did not actually commit the crime Anderton/Cruise thinks he did (kidnapping and killing his son). Thus, the screening of that scene indicates that Anderton/Cruise would kill an innocent, and will fall into a trap.

See also
List of American films of 1955

References

Bibliography

External links
 
 
 
 
 
 House of Bamboo film trailer at YouTube

1955 films
1955 crime drama films
20th Century Fox films
Color film noir
American detective films
1950s English-language films
Films directed by Samuel Fuller
Films set in Tokyo
Films shot in Tokyo
American crime drama films
Films scored by Leigh Harline
Japan in non-Japanese culture
Films with screenplays by Harry Kleiner
CinemaScope films
1950s American films